The Journal of Cosmetic & Laser Therapy is a bimonthly peer-reviewed medical journal covering applications of cosmetic laser and light therapies on the skin. It is published by Informa and the editor-in-chief is David J. Goldberg (New York City). The journal was established in 1999. According to the Journal Citation Reports, the journal has a 2014 impact factor of 1.110.

References

External links 
 

Laser medicine
English-language journals
Surgery journals
Bimonthly journals
Taylor & Francis academic journals
Publications established in 1999